Wham! in China: Foreign Skies is a 1986 documentary film about the English pop duo Wham! consisting of George Michael and Andrew Ridgeley. It follows Wham! on their historic 10-day visit to China during the 1985 world tour when they became the first Western pop act to visit the country. The film is a British venture produced by Big Boys Overseas Limited and CBS Records, with CBS/Fox Video serving as distributor.

Directed by Lindsay Anderson and produced by Jazz Summers, Martin Lewis and Simon Napier-Bell, Wham! in China: Foreign Skies had its world premiere at the farewell concert held at London's Wembley Stadium on 28 June 1986.

Production

Development
Manager Simon Napier-Bell’s negotiation for the two performances took over 18 months. Napier-Bell used cunning tactics to sabotage the efforts of rock band Queen to be the first to play in China: he made two brochures for the Chinese authorities – one featuring Wham! [Michael] as "wholesome", and one portraying Queen lead singer Freddie Mercury in typically flamboyant poses. The Chinese opted for Wham!.

In December 1984 Wham! set out for their second concert tour, The Big Tour a commercial success, which promoted primarily their second studio album, Make It Big. The concept of filming Foreign Skies began when producer Martin Lewis was busy directing the 1985 documentary about Julian Lennon, titled Stand by Me - A Portrait of Julian Lennon. During a Wham! performance on February 14, 1985 at the Beacon Theatre in New York, he met the duo's co-manager Jazz Summers and discussed the possibility of filming the China tour. When Lewis had permission for the film, it took two weeks to prepare the 35-member international crew, including transportation of a sound desk and super 16 camera equipment.

British director Lindsay Anderson was engaged to accompany Wham! to China in April 1985. The second leg in East Asia began with two concerts in Hong Kong, before moving to China and a concert at the Workers' Gymnasium in Beijing on 7 April in front of a crowd of 12,000, who paid about $1.75 each. They also played a concert on 10 April in front of 5,000 in Canton where tickets cost about $5.50 each. The two concerts were played without compensation, however Wham's visit to China attracted huge media attention across the world. Promotion of the project cost at least $1.5 million which was self-funded, due to Michael wanting artistic control over the film.

Post-production
The film created by Strathford Hamilton and Andy Morahan was shot over two weeks, was then edited over summer and autumn 1985 in London. Anderson called his one-hour and 18 minute film If You Were There. In the final stages of editing, Anderson was dismissed in October 1985 by Wham!'s management, the editing team quit, and the film was entirely re-edited, renamed and released as Wham! in China: Foreign Skies.

Music
The soundtrack used in the film was taken from the albums Fantastic and Make It Big. The documentary features some concert footage and studio cut excerpts of the following tracks:
 "Bad Boys"	
 "Club Tropicana"	
 "Blue" (concert footage)
 "Wake Me Up Before You Go-Go"	
 "Ray Of Sunshine"	
 "Young Guns (Go For It)"	
 "Careless Whisper" (concert footage)
 "Everything She Wants" (concert footage)
 "Like A Baby"	
 "If You Were There"	
 "Runaway"	
 "Love Machine" (concert footage)

Release
The world premiere of Wham! in China: Foreign Skies was shown at London's Wembley Stadium on large video screens on Saturday 28 June 1986 before The Final began. With an audience of 72,000; this set a record for the largest audience at a film premiere.

Home media
It was released on VHS, Betamax and LaserDisc in October 1986. The documentary has yet to be issued on DVD and only one track "Blue (Live In China)" from the film has been officially released on their studio album Music from the Edge of Heaven. 
In the United States the video retailed at $19.98 and debuted at number 8 on Billboards Top Music Videocassettes chart, for the week ending 25 October 1986 and climbed to number 4, two weeks later. As the video started to climb up the chart, and for the week ending 6 December 1986, it reached number 1, replacing The #1 Video Hits by Whitney Houston. Wham! in China: Foreign Skies was the sixteenth best-selling music videocassette for 1986. It was present on the top 20 chart for a total of 17 weeks until February 1987. The video was certified gold in April 1987 by the Recording Industry Association of America (RIAA) for shipment of 50,000 copies.

Charts and certifications

Charts

Certifications

Credits

Executive Producers: Jazz Summers and Simon Napier-Bell
Musical Production and Arrangement: George Michael
Additional Music: Richard Hartley
Supervising Editor: Peter Davies
Editor: Nigel Galt
Assistant Editors: Peter Culverwell, Len Tremble, Mark Mostyn, Finn Arden
Director of Photography: David Myers
Photography: Peter Mackay, Paul Goldsmith, Lee Kenower, Dennis Smith, Alvin Allen
Assistant Cameramen: George Stephenson, Paul Cameron, Leslie Otis, Bobby Shepherd
Camera Technician: Ernest Jew

Gaffer: James Sofranko
Documentary Lighting Director: Michael Lesser
Song Mixing: Chris Porter
Sound Editor: Alan Plaey
Re-recording Mixer: Dean Humphries
Documentary Sound: Paul Rusnak
Lighting Designer: Jonathon Smeeton
Associate Producer: Michael Owen
Post-production Supervisor: Sarah O’Brien
Assistant Director: Steven Bull
Location Manager: Joel Hinman
Make-up: Melanie Panos
Wardrobe: Yioda Panos
Titles: Optical Film Effects

See also
Wham! discography
The Big Tour
List of British films of 1986

References

External links

 

1986 films
1986 documentary films
British documentary films
Concert films
1980s English-language films
Films directed by Lindsay Anderson
1980s British films